Blast Monkeys is a physics based mobile puzzle video game developed by American studio Yobonja and was released for iOS in January 2011 and Android in February 2011. The game was developed using Corona SDK. There are 13 worlds with 30 levels each.

Gameplay
Blast Monkeys is a physics based puzzle game where the play must reach a floating bunch of bananas marked 'GOAL' to finish each level. The monkey is blasted out a cannon at a direction based on the players choosing. There are 3 bananas scattered around every level that the player can collect to increase their end of level score.  More level worlds can be unlocked via spending "Monkey Coins", a currency found while playing the game.

See also
Cut the Rope
Corona SDK

References

External links
Promotional site
Metacritic

2011 video games
IOS games
Android (operating system) games
Puzzle video games
Windows Phone games
Video games developed in the United States